The Fat was an Australian sports based talk show television series, broadcast and produced by ABC TV.The series began on 6 March 2000, and ended on 18 November 2003.

Program synopsis
Host Tony Squires, with regulars Peter Wilkins and Rebecca Wilson ran through the week's sporting news, showing the lighter side of things.  One particular highlight of each episode was Slammin' Sam Kekovich's deadpan analysis of all things Australian.  Regulars guests included: Dr Turf (John Rothfield), Kerry O'Keeffe, Wil Anderson, Jason Akermanis and Liz Ellis. Initially the show consisted of a 30-minute Monday night wrap of the weekend's sports. After gaining popularity, 2002 saw the show extended to a one-hour timeslot still on a Monday night. In 2003 the format, scheduling and length of the show was altered, with a one and half hour show being shown on Friday night. Criticisms arose of the new format, which saw the show turn away from only sports topics and into a variety show. The Friday night scheduling eliminated the wrap of the previous weekend's sporting events eventually resulting in a ratings drop and much of the popularity subsided.

In February 2004, Tony and Rebecca moved to rival commercial network Seven, to present what was essentially a carbon copy of The Fat, the short-lived 110% Tony Squires.

John Rothfield went on to continue his radio gigs at 3AW Melbourne on Glossing Over every Saturday morning until the show was axed. His pride and joy is now golf and looking after his three children, Emma Phoebe and Sophia.

External links
 Official website
 

Australian comedy television series
Australian Broadcasting Corporation original programming
2000 Australian television series debuts
2003 Australian television series endings